Seppo Keskinarkaus (born 29 September 1949 in Rovaniemi) is a Finnish orienteering competitor. He received a silver medal in the relay event and finished 11th in the individual event at the 1979 World Orienteering Championships in Tampere.

See also
 Finnish orienteers
 List of orienteers
 List of orienteering events

References

1949 births
Living people
Finnish orienteers
Male orienteers
Foot orienteers
World Orienteering Championships medalists